West Nottingham Academy is an independent co-ed school serves both boarding and day students in grades 9-12. It was founded in 1744 by the Presbyterian preacher Samuel Finley, who later became President of The College of New Jersey (now Princeton University). The , tree-lined campus is located in Colora, Cecil County, Maryland near the Chesapeake Bay – an hour south of Philadelphia and forty-five minutes north of Baltimore.

The school claims to be "the oldest boarding school in the United States" and has the oldest founding date of any school still in operation.

Academics 

West Nottingham offers a college preparatory program that emphasizes critical thinking. Classes are offered in the arts, humanities, foreign languages, mathematics and sciences. The academic program also offers an English as Second-Language (ESL) program for international students (25% of WNA's students come from outside the US, including Japan, Australia, South Korea, Barbados, Russia, Brazil, Nigeria, Spain and China).

History 

West Nottingham's early graduates include many of the most prominent colonial Americans. In 1744, an Irish Presbyterian preacher Samuel Finley was called to take charge of the newly formed congregation on the lower branch of the Octoraro Creek, a short distance south of what was soon to become the Mason-Dixon line. The congregation lived on the broad, rolling land known as the Nottingham Lots.

Finley, in later years became president of the College of New Jersey (Princeton University), was a teacher as well as a preacher. Finley held that to be an intelligent Christian one needed to use the mind God provided, and that one's mind could reach full effectiveness only through training. The task of the church, for Finley, was to administer the sacraments and comfort the sick, to baptize the infants and consecrate marriage, to bury the dead and preach the Word of God. But the task of the church also was to teach men and women to think by exposing them to the great thoughts of the ages in order to produce rational beings capable of creative action in a new and swiftly changing world.

Finley opened the school in 1744. It was a crude log structure at the rear of his own home, located near the present site of the Rising Sun Middle School. The log building on the present campus was built as a replica of the original school building from descriptions in old records and students’ memoirs.

Within a few years, church and Academy were moved to their present location. A two-story building was erected to house the school activities at the site of what is now the sunken garden at Gayley. When it burned, a single-story building replaced it, only to be destroyed some years later by storm. In 1865 the red brick J. Paul Slaybaugh Old Academy was erected and stands to this day.

The Academy was the first of the Presbyterian preparatory boarding schools and the forerunner of some 1,600 similar academies in the country. As public education became the norm, the Presbyterian Church allowed most of its secondary schools to close or converted them to colleges.
 
The Chesapeake Learning Center was founded in the 2000s and with a focus on international students there was the creation of the English as a Second Language curriculum. A middle school was started but was closed in 2006, completing its last year in 2009.

Many new facilities were constructed, including the C. Herbert Foutz Student Center (1989), the East and West Dormitories (1998), and the Patricia A. Bathon Science Center (2003), or renovated including Magraw Hall (2000), and Finley Hall (2002). Summer 2007 saw the complete renovation of Rush Dormitory, renamed Rush House, and the construction of Durigg Plaza, an outdoor amphitheater/meeting space for the campus community. Renovation of Rowland dormitory was completed in the summer of 2008.

Historic district

West Nottingham Academy Historic District is a national historic district at Colora, Cecil County, Maryland, United States. The principal historic buildings include the Old Academy or Canteen, constructed 1864, a single-story, three-part Victorian brick building with a distinctive stick-decorated belfry; the Gayley House, constructed about 1830, a prominent -story brick dwelling; and Magraw Hall, constructed 1929, a large gambrel-roofed stone administration building. Also on the property are Wiley House (about 1840), Becktel House (about 1900), Hilltop House (about 1900), the barn or old gym (about 1930) which burned down in February 1993, as well as the stone entrance and stone bridges. Founded in 1744, the West Nottingham Academy is the oldest operating boarding school in Maryland.

The historic core of the Academy were listed on the National Register of Historic Places in 1990 as the West Nottingham Academy Historic District.

Athletics & Activities

Though the school community is small, the academy does field a variety of sports teams including:
 
Soccer, Prep and Varsity Basketball, Lacrosse, Wrestling (boys and girls), Baseball, Cross Country, Volleyball, VEX Robotics, Tennis, Yoga, Martial Arts, and Physical Education.

The Academy also has a rather successful Figure Skating program. Current students include previous members of Team USA, Meredith Pipkin and 2012 Winter Youth Olympic Games Team Member, Michael Johnson who is also a previous national medalist. He is the Intermediate Pairs silver medalist Michael Johnson with Caitlin Belt.

Additional afternoon activities include Yearbook, Theatre, Photography, Green Rams Environmental Club and the school newspaper, The Arrow.
As part of WNA's commitment to lifelong fitness and activity all students are asked to participate in a sport or club throughout the school year, one per trimester.

Notable alumni
John Archer - early Maryland politician
Harry Anderson (baseball) - former Major League Baseball Player
Josh Boone - former NBA basketball player
Ross Cameron - President of Charms Candy Company and inventor of the Charms Blow Pop
Austin Lane Crothers - Maryland governor, 1908–1912
John Filson - author, founder of Cincinnati
Eric Fischl - artist and sculptor
Michael Johnson- 2012 Winter Youth Olympian. (Pairs Figure Skating)
Ray Ganong - Head Strength & Conditioning Coach for Louisville Cardinals men's basketball
Ebenezer Hazard - United States Postmaster General from 1782 to 1789
Peter H. Kostmayer - former US Congressman from Pennsylvania
Alexander Martin - early governor of North Carolina
John Morgan - co-founder of the University of Pennsylvania Medical School
Benjamin Rush - Father of American psychiatry, signer of the Declaration of Independence
William Shippen Jr. - co-founder of the University of Pennsylvania Medical School
Richard Stockton - signer of the Declaration of Independence
Blake Ragsdale Van Leer III - grandson of Blake Ragsdale Van Leer and notable entrepreneur
Ryan Mottley - Top 5 Maryland Highschool Lacrosse player of all time

References

History of West Nottingham Academy, 1744–1981, Scott A. Mills, Maryland Historical Project, 1985, 
°http://www.gocards.com/sports/m-baskbl/mtt/ray_ganong_156338.html

External links

, including photo from 2002, at Maryland Historical Trust
The Association of Boarding Schools profile

 
Schools in Cecil County, Maryland
Boarding schools in Maryland
Preparatory schools in Maryland
Private high schools in Maryland
Presbyterian schools in the United States
Presbyterianism in Maryland
Co-educational boarding schools
Educational institutions established in 1744
Historic districts in Cecil County, Maryland
School buildings on the National Register of Historic Places in Maryland
1744 establishments in Maryland
Historic districts on the National Register of Historic Places in Maryland
National Register of Historic Places in Cecil County, Maryland
Christian schools in Maryland